Events from the year 1594 in India.

Events
 Korlai Fort, Maharashtra largely destroyed by the Portuguese

See also
 Timeline of Indian history

References